Weddings in India vary according to the region, the religion, the community and the personal preferences of the bride and groom. They are festive occasions in India, and in most cases celebrated with extensive decorations, colour, dresses, music, dance, costumes and rituals that depend on the community, region and religion of the bride and the groom, as well as their preferences. India celebrates about 10 million weddings per year, of which about 80% are Hindu weddings.

Ceremonies in Hinduism
While there are many festival-related rituals in Hinduism, vivaah (wedding) is the most extensive personal ritual an adult Hindu undertakes in his or her life. Typical Hindu families spend significant effort and financial resources to prepare and celebrate weddings. The rituals and process of a Hindu wedding vary depending on region of India, local adaptations, resources of the family and preferences of the bride and the groom. Nevertheless, there are a few key rituals common in Hindu weddings – Kanyadaan, Panigrahana, and Saptapadi; these are respectively, gifting away of daughter by the father, voluntarily holding hand near the fire to signify impending union, and taking seven steps before fire with each step including a set of mutual vows. After the seventh step and vows of Saptapadi, the couple is legally husband and wife. Jain and Buddhist weddings in India, share many themes, but are centered around their respective religious ideas and texts.

Other religions
Indian Sikhs get married through a ceremony called Anand Karaj. The couple walk around the holy book, the Guru Granth Sahib four times, and then do an Ardaas, a traditional Sikh prayer.

Indian Muslims celebrate a traditional Islamic wedding, with rituals include Nikah, payment of financial dower called Mahr by the groom to the bride, signing of marriage contract, and a reception.

Indian Christian weddings followings traditional Christian marriage customs. Among Protestants in India, the betrothal rite celebrates the engagement of a couple, with prayers being offered for a couple and engagement rings being blessed by a pastor. A day before the wedding, the Haldi/Ubtan/Mayun ceremony (as it is known in northern India) or the Roce ceremony (as it is known in the Goa area of India) is held, in which "haldi or turmeric paste is applied on North Indian Christians and coconut paste is applied on South Indian Christians." After some time, Indian Christians are married in a church wedding, during which, the couple meet in the presence of a minister, often in a church or place of worship. Readings from the Bible take place. The bride and groom take their marriage vows. The bride and groom often exchange rings as a sign of their endless love.

Interfaith marriages in India, especially between Hindus and Muslims, have been the subject of legal constraints in some states, vigilante harassment, and fears of violence.

Marriage age
In the past, the age of marriage was young. The average age of marriage for women in India has increased to 21 years, according to the 2011 Census of India. In 2009, about 7% of women got married before the age of 18. Arranged marriages have long been the norm in Indian society. Even today, the majority of Indians have their marriages planned by their parents and other respected family members. Recent studies suggest that Indian culture is trending away from traditional arranged marriages. Fewer marriages are purely arranged without consent and that the majority of surveyed Indian marriages are arranged with consent. The percentage of self-arranged marriages (called love marriages in India) have also increased vastly, particularly in the urban areas of India such as Mumbai and Delhi.

Wedding industry
Weddings are a major business in India.  According to a report by KPMG in 2017, the Indian wedding industry is estimated to be around $40–50 billion in size. It is the second largest wedding market after USA, which is at $70 billion. While the industry is very unorganised with small and medium scale businesses, there are also corporates who are trying to tap this industry. The prime factors for growth in the industry are the rise of middle class in India, an overall booming economy and use of social media.  It is estimated that the cost of an Indian wedding ranges between ₹500,000 to ₹50 Million (from US$6,747.14 to US$674,743.50, respectively). An Indian is likely to spend one fifth of his total life time wealth on a wedding.

Destination weddings
Many Indian celebrities choose destination weddings, and Indians take inspiration from them. Both domestic and international destinations are popular for weddings in India. The destination wedding industry in India is estimated to cross ₹450 Billion in 2020.

Wedding photography
Pre-wedding shoots along with wedding photography are also having a big stake in Indian weddings. Average Wedding shoots can cost ranging from ₹15,000 to ₹100,000 per day.

Roka Ceremony At Indian Wedding
The “Roka ceremony is the first step toward marriage”. It is one of the most significant pre-wedding ceremonies in Indian weddings. In an Indian system, the boy, along with his parents and other family members, first see the girl. If the girl and boy like each other and give their consent to get married to each other, then the girl’s family will give some money, sweets, and gifts to the boy; similarly, the boy’s family will give money, sweets, and gifts, like gold jewelry, etc., to the girl.

See also

Hindu wedding
Hindu Marriage Act, 1955
Muslim personal law
The Indian Christian Marriage Act, 1872
Dowry system in India
Interfaith marriage
White wedding (Christian)
Islamic marital practices

References

External links

New York Magazine: "10 Things I Learned at My First White-People Wedding" By Beejoli Shah September 26, 2014
Brass Bands: Tradition, Change, and the Mass Media in Indian Wedding Music (Baaraat) Gregory Booth
 

 
India
Indian wedding traditions